Cryptantha cinerea (common name James' catseye) is a plant found in the United States.

Uses
Among the Zuni people, the powdered root of the jamesii variety is used to relieve a sore anus.

References

cinerea
Flora of the United States
Plants used in traditional Native American medicine
Plants described in 1896